Wilderness Safaris is an ecotourism operator, headquartered in Gaborone, Botswana. It operates camps and mobile safaris across six countries: Botswana, Kenya, Namibia, Rwanda, Zambia and Zimbabwe. Known for its ongoing conservation work, the company is helping to conserve some 33 species on the IUCN Red List and lists some 2.5 million hectares as being under protection.

As a destination management company, Wilderness Safaris has its own bush air charter company, Wilderness Air, as well as touring arms in Victoria Falls, Zimbabwe/Zambia and Wilderness Safaris Private Journeys in Cape Town, South Africa.

Through the Wilderness Wildlife Trust, Wilderness Safaris funds more than 20 conservation, community and anti-poaching projects every year, and it is also a primary sponsor of Children in the Wilderness, a non-profit organisation that facilitates sustainable conservation through leadership development and education of rural children in Africa.

Wilderness Safaris was founded in Botswana in 1983 by two overland safari guides – Colin Bell and Chris McIntyre. It was the first tour operator of its kind to form a registered company in Botswana, with operations based out of Maun, south of the Okavango Delta.

Wilderness Safaris’ interpretation of ecotourism is structured around the 4Cs, a concept adopted from the Long Run Initiative of Jochen Zeitz: a balance of commerce, conservation, community and culture.

Wilderness Safaris’ philosophy is to minimise their impact on the environment and to proactively contribute to the conservation of threatened species in the areas in which they operate.

References

External links
 
 

Organizations established in 1983
Ecotourism
Charity fundraisers
Community-building organizations
Companies of Botswana
1983 establishments in Botswana